Cameraria platanoidiella is a moth of the family Gracillariidae. It is known from Connecticut, New York and Ohio in the United States.

The wingspan is 6.5–8 mm.

The larvae feed on Quercus species, including Quercus alba, Quercus bicolor and Quercus macrocarpa. They mine the leaves of their host plant. The mine has the form of a blotch mine on the upperside of the leaf. The larva is of the flat type, and when mature spins an oval flat cocoon.

References

External links
mothphotographersgroup
Cameraria at microleps.org

Cameraria (moth)
Leaf miners
Moths of North America
Lepidoptera of the United States
Moths described in 1908
Taxa named by Annette Frances Braun